The Doodletown Pipers (also known as the New Doodletown Pipers) were a 1960s and 1970s easy listening vocal group founded by Ward Ellis, George Wilkins, Bernie Brillstein and Jerry Weintraub.

The Doodletown Pipers made numerous appearances on network television (including The Ed Sullivan Show), and worked with such names as Count Basie, The Carpenters, Perry Como, Bing Crosby, Bob Hope, Frank Gorshin, Alan King, Mike Post, Sarah Vaughan, John Wayne, and Rowan and Martin.  Members of the group included "Mic" Bell, Mike Campbell, Jim Gilstrap, Teresa Graves, Augie Johnson, Rod Anderson, Tom McKenzie, Samantha Lessard, and Oren Waters.

The Doodletown Pipers are considered by some to be the epitome of bland, squeaky-clean popular music.  One critic describes their music paradoxically as "dull-as-lint" yet at the same time "weirdly but undeniably charming."  On his television program, Roger Miller referred to them as the "Poodletown Diapers".

Development
The Doodletown Pipers' first appearance was on The Red Skelton Show with 30 members in the group. The group was then cut down to 20 members when they opened for George Burns and Lainie Kazan at The Nugget in Sparks, Nevada in June, 1966. The original members were Holly Mershon, Teresa Graves, Helen (Aiken) Maxwell, Joy Jolley, Helen Sexton, Natalie Cirello, Jill McDonald, Kathy Cahill, Lynn Dolin, Pat Henderson, Karen Warren, and Linda A., Mike Campbell, "Little Ricky" Richard Doran, "Big Bob" Anderson, Gene Meyer, Tommy Webb, Russell Carson, Bill Lively, Marshall Ramirez, Emmitt Cash, and Bob Kenny. Some of the first replacements were Rod Anderson, Steve Sweetland, Jim Gilstrap, Augie Johnson, Ellie Mandel, Elaine Blakely, Lorna Wright, Pam Feener, Sharry Dore, Larry Puma, Kathy Wright, Jan Bunch, Patty "Chocolate" Banks, Samantha "Sammie" Williams, and Taffy Jones.
 
The group worked non-stop from 1966 through the late 1970s. They toured with Nancy Wilson, who was an early supporter of the group. They also opened for, among others, Perry Como, Jane Morgan (whose husband, Jerry Weintraub, was one of the group's managers), Eddie Fisher, Shelley Berman, Phil Harris, and Henry Mancini. The Pipers also worked such venues as The Greek Theater, Madison Square Garden, Avery Fisher Hall, The Sands,  Sahara, Flamingo and Frontier Hotels in Las Vegas, Lake Tahoe and Reno, Nevada.

The DTPs had two television shows. The Smothers Brothers' 1967 Summer replacement show called Our Place co-starring Jack Burns, Avery Schreiber and Rowlf the Dog (puppeteered by Jim Henson). It was produced by Ed Sullivan. The second show was six (6) one-hour specials starring the DTPs with guest-stars such as Norm Crosby. They were semi-regulars on The Roger Miller Show (1966) and were regulars on The Carpenters summer 1971 TV show Make Your Own Kind of Music, both on NBC. Other television appearances included The Jerry Lewis Show, The Beautiful Phyllis Diller Show, and The Ed Sullivan Show (six times, once following a promotional video for The Beatles' "Hello, Goodbye"). They appeared on specials including "Rodgers & Hart Today," the Emmy Award-winning Sing Out Sweet Land with John Wayne, and numerous shows with Bing Crosby and Perry Como.
 
While the group's records had reasonable success, after they were signed by Bell Records as "The New Doodletown Pipers" by TV composer and record producer Mike Post in 1971, their new records met with little success.

Their last appearance may have been in 1987, when they appeared on Dave Letterman's Old Fashioned Christmas, a special episode of Late Night with David Letterman.

Post-Pipers
Some of the members continued their careers after they left The Doodletown Pipers:
 Teresa Graves became a regular on Laugh-In and later starred on Get Christie Love!. 
 Helen Maxwell fell victim to a stalker and became a nationally recognized public safety/criminal justice journalist (ABC 20/20, CBS This Morning, Home Show) appearing on more network television shows for that, than for singing and dancing. 
 Taffy Jones later became a regular on The Dean Martin Show as one of the four Ding-a-ling Sisters touring with Engelbert Humperdinck and Bob Hope; made numerous appearances on The Tonight Show Starring Johnny Carson; and appeared with Dean Martin at the Riviera Hotel in Las Vegas. Taffy also worked with Frank Sinatra, Andy Williams, Phyllis Diller, Bing Crosby, Gene Kelly, Wayne Newton, Joey Bishop, Petula Clark, Don Ho, Juliet Prowse, Ginger Rogers, Bill Cosby, and Red Skelton. 
 Steve Sweetland became a very well known European and New York voice teacher. 
 Tommy Webb spent years touring with Mac Davis and Connie Stevens. 
 Lynn Dolin worked on Johnny Mann's Stand Up and Cheer and had a solo career in the Christian music field. 
 Jim Gilstrap became a legendary studio singer/contractor and worked with Stevie Wonder for years. (His is the first voice you hear on "You Are the Sunshine of My Life.")
 "Little Ricky" Richard Doran toured with the National company of the Tony Award-winning show George M! and co-starred in the movie "Harrad Summer." 
 Patty "Chocolate" Banks was an original member of Graham Central Station as well as Rose Royce. 
 Holly Mershon has continued to work as an actress, background singer, model and of all things, a professional clown, appearing recently in a festival in Barcelona, Spain with her partner. 
 Mike Campbell is a well known jazz singer and voice teacher with CDs on Palo Alto, I.T.I., Audiophile and Celeste Records. He has opened for Sarah Vaughan among others, and has appeared in Japan, Australia, Sweden, and all over the United States in jazz festivals, concerts and clinics. He heads the Vocal Department at the Musicians Institute in Hollywood, CA. 
 Mic Bell was nominated for a Tony Award for his performed as "Joe" in the Broadway revival of Show Boat.  
 Tom McKenzie later became a studio singer, as well as the lead singer of The Archies singing group on The U.S. of Archie show, and certain episodes of the Groovie Goolies cartoon series.  
 Oren Waters has sung background vocals on numerous singles, albums and CDs, including those recorded by Michael Jackson and Neil Diamond. 
 In 1970, Rod Anderson began directing the shows and entertainment at the Polynesian Cultural Center in Hawaii and then the Owner/Director of Universal Artists Management booking mainland and local groups in Hawaii and producing concerts and convention shows.

Founder Bernie Brillstein became a Hollywood talent manager, whose clients included John Belushi, Dan Aykroyd, Jim Henson, Martin Short, Rob Lowe, Bill Maher, and Chris Farley.

Music directors included:
 Ed Lojeski had a successful career as accompanist and musical consultant for motion pictures, television, and live entertainment.
 George Wilkins became a staff composer for Disney theme parks and music composer for the famous Teddy Ruxpin toys.
 Richard Bellis and John Beal became successful film and television music composers.

Popular culture
The group received a publicity boost when they were mentioned in a 1997 episode of The Simpsons titled "El Viaje Misterioso de Nuestro Jomer (The Mysterious Voyage of Homer)":

Homer: "We don't have anything in common. Look at these records: Jim Nabors, Glen Campbell, the Doodletown Pipers. Now look at her records! They stink!"
 
The group was also mentioned in season six of the movie-lampooning TV show Mystery Science Theater 3000, the episode (episode #620) in which Mike and the bots watch the 1967 Italian spy film Danger!! Death Ray.  Shortly after the opening credits end, the wordless-vocal theme song (that plays periodically throughout the film) continues over the action. As the song ends, robot Crow affects the voice of a radio DJ, saying: "That was Bop-ba-dop-a-da-da by the Doodletown Pipers!"

The Main Street Singers and New Main Street Singers in A Mighty Wind are partially inspired by The Doodletown Pipers.

Discography 
 Singalong '67 (Epic Records, 1967)
 Here Come the Doodletown Pipers (Epic Records, 1966)
 Love Themes: Hit Songs for Those in Love (1968)

References

External links 
 [ Allmusic review of Love Themes: Hit Songs for Those in Love]

American vocal groups
Musical groups established in 1965